100 Day Bach is a 2015 New Zealand home renovation reality TV show. The series follows New Zealand celebrity Interior designer and presenter Hamish Dodd as he works on building and designing a holiday home in 100 days with the help of his wife, at the time, his partner Anita Dodd.

From August 2017 the show appeared on Netflix in Canada, India, Ireland, South Africa, the United Kingdom and the United States.

100 Day Bach is the first series which is part of the 100 Day Home series. The follow up series to 100 Day Bach, is 100 Day Renovation which aired in 2019.

Synopsis 
Interior designer Hamish Dodd and wife, at the time, his partner Anita Dodd purchased some property in Kuratau, New Zealand in late 2014. This developed the idea to film the project for 100 Day Bach. The aim of the series is to get their holiday home built in under 100 days. As mentioned throughout the series, Dodd grew up with his own family in Kuratau as a child.

Production 
The television show was filmed over the New Zealand winter in 2015. They made the decision to build during the winter the previous summer.

References

External links 
 100 Day Bach on Stripe Media

2015 New Zealand television series debuts
Choice TV original programming
New Zealand reality television series